The Department of Enterprise, Trade and Employment is a department of the Government of Ireland. It is led by the Minister for Enterprise, Trade and Employment.

Departmental team
Minister for Enterprise, Trade and Employment: Simon Coveney, TD
Minister of State for Trade Promotion, Digital and Company Regulation: Dara Calleary, TD
Minister of State for Employment Affairs and Retail Businesses: Neale Richmond, TD
Secretary General of the Department: Orlaigh Quinn

Overview

The official headquarters and ministerial offices of the department are at Kildare Street, Dublin. It is one of the most important economic departments in the Irish Government, responsible for the implementation of policy in five key areas:
 Enterprise, Innovation, Growth
 Quality Work and Learning
 Making Markets and Regulation work better
 Quality, Value and Continuous Improvement
 the European Union.

A large element of the work of the Department arises from Ireland's membership of a number of international organisations, in particular the European Union and the World Trade Organization. The Department plays an active role in the development of EU and WTO policies, particularly to ensure that Ireland's interests are protected. The Department is organised into five divisions. They are:
Innovation and Investment Division
Enterprise and Trade Division
Commerce, Consumer and Competition Division
Employment Rights and Industrial Relations Division
Corporate Services

Bodies and offices associated with the Department
The department oversees a large number of bodies and agencies. In July 2009 the Special Group on Public Service Numbers and Expenditure Programmes proposed merging the Competition Authority and the National Consumer Agency.  However, this process remains at an early stage. Until 2010, the Department was responsible for FÁS, which had its responsibilities divided up between two bodies in 2013. Bodies and agencies associated with the Department include:

Companies Registration Office
Competition and Consumer Protection Commission
Local Enterprise Offices
Director of Corporate Enforcement
Employment Appeals Tribunal
Enterprise Ireland
Health and Safety Authority
IDA Ireland
InterTradeIreland (under North-South co-operation structures)
Irish Auditing and Accounting Supervisory Authority
Labour Court
Workplace Relations Commission
National Standards Authority of Ireland
Office of the Register of Friendly Societies
Patents Office
Personal Injuries Assessment Board

History
In the Ministry of Dáil Éireann of the Irish Republic (1919–1922) there was a separate Minister for Industries and a Director of Trade and Commerce. These titled varied over the course of the ministries established during this revolutionary period. In the Irish Free State, there was a Minister for Industry and Commerce as part of the first Executive Council of the Irish Free State established in 1922. This was given a statutory basis by the Ministers and Secretaries Act 1924. This act provided it with:

The Schedule assigned it with the duties of the following bodies:

Ministry of Transport (excluding the Roads Department).
The Board of Trade.
Registrar of Companies.
Registrar of Business Names.
Registration of Shipping.
Minister for Labour.
Electricity Commissioners.
Chief and other Inspectors of Factories.

Alteration of name and transfer of functions

References

External links
Department of Enterprise, Trade and Employment
Structure of the Department 
Spending by the Department

 
Enterprise, Trade and Employmen
Ireland
Ireland
Labour in the Republic of Ireland
Economy of the Republic of Ireland
Ireland, Enterprise, Trade and Employmen
1919 establishments in Ireland
Ireland